Archips solidus is a species of moth of the family Tortricidae. It is found in India (Darjeeling in West Bengal) and Malaysia.

The larvae feed on Annona muricata and Cedrela toona.

References

Moths described in 1908
Archips
Moths of Asia